Patricia Briggs (born 1965) is an American writer of fantasy since 1993, and author of the Mercy Thompson urban fantasy series.

Biography
Patricia Briggs was born in 1965 in Butte, Montana, United States. She now resides in Benton City, WA

Briggs began writing in 1990 and published her first novel Masques in 1993. She wrote primarily in the fantasy genre until her editor asked her to write an urban fantasy, since the genre was showing promising growth. Briggs wrote Moon Called, which was published in 2006 and made it to the USA Today bestseller lists.  The second book in the series, Blood Bound, hit The New York Times Best Seller list. The third book, Iron Kissed, was a number one New York Times bestseller and subsequent novels have continued to perform similarly in sales.

Published works

Sianim series
Masques (1993) also in Shifter's Wolf
Wolfsbane (2010) also in Shifter's Wolf
Steal the Dragon (1995)
When Demons Walk (1998)

Hurog duology
 Dragon Bones (2002)
 Dragon Blood (2003)

Raven duology
 Raven's Shadow (2004)
 Raven's Strike (2005)

Mercyverse
For the complete Timeline for the "Mercyverse"

Mercy Thompson series
Mercedes Thompson is part Native American and a Coyote Walker. She was raised by werewolves, is a pretty good mechanic, and lives in the Tri-Cities Area of Washington. The series follows Mercy through her relationship with the local Alpha werewolf, who lives across her back fence, on a series of misadventures with all manner of magical and otherworldly creatures from the land of the Fae.  Mercy is tough as nails, with a heart of gold, often finding herself entangled in one complicated problem after another in her desire to help the underdog.  With her sharp mind, and equally sharp wit, Mercy battles injustice and her own insecurities about her past, in this refreshingly fun and creative series.

Alpha and Omega series 
This stand-alone series is woven throughout the Mercyverse, following Anna Latham, a fierce and empathetic werewolf, and Charles Cornick, the enforcer of the North American werewolves. Alpha and Omega begins while Mercy's story in Moon Called occurs. Then, starting with Cry Wolf, which is set right after the events of Moon Called, the series run parallel.

Stand-alone novels
 The Hob's Bargain (2001)

Graphic novels
Set in the same world as the Mercy Thompson series
Mercy Thompson: Homecoming (2009)
Patricia Briggs' Mercy Thompson: Moon Called (2012)
Cry Wolf: Alpha and Omega (2012)
Mercy Thompson: Hopcross Jilly (2014)

Anthologies and collections

References

External links
 Mercyverse Timeline
 Patricia Briggs' Official Site
 Night Owl Reviews – Patricia Briggs Magazine Interview
 Fantastic Fiction – Patricia Briggs Biography
 Crescent Blue Author Interview: "Patricia Briggs"
 Novel synopses, cover art, and reviews at Fantasy Literature.net
 Spain Fan Page - 2009 archive
 
 Fantasy News-Interview: "Patricia Briggs"

1965 births
20th-century American novelists
21st-century American novelists
American fantasy writers
American women short story writers
American women novelists
Living people
People from Butte, Montana
Urban fantasy writers
Women science fiction and fantasy writers
Writers from Montana
20th-century American women writers
21st-century American women writers
20th-century American short story writers
21st-century American short story writers